

Delta Gamma chapters 
Following is a list of Delta Gamma chapters. Active chapters are bolded. Inactive chapters and  institutions are in italic.

Notes

References 

 
Delta Gamma